Gānnán Tibetan Autonomous Prefecture is an autonomous prefecture in southern Gansu Province, China, bordering Linxia to the north, Dingxi to the northeast, Longnan to the east and Aba (Sichuan province) to the south . It includes Xiahe and the Labrang Monastery, Luqu, Maqu and other mostly Tibetan towns and villages. In the first year of the proclamation of Gannan Autonomous District, the district-seat was at the Labrang Town of Sangqu.

Population
According to the 2010 census, Gannan has 689,132 inhabitants (population density: 17.14 inhabitants per km2).

Ethnic groups in Gannan, 2000 census

Transport
In the prefecture is high-way G213. In 2013, the Gannan Xiahe Airport was opened.

Subdivisions 
1 county level city, 7 counties.

Climate
Gannan, as illustrated by this chart for Xiahe, has an alpine subarctic climate (Köppen Dwc) that grades into an alpine climate (ETH) at the highest elevations. The climate is characterised by mild, rainy summers and frigid, but dry and sunny, winters.

See also
Zorgey Ritoma

References

Further reading 
 A. Gruschke: The Cultural Monuments of Tibet’s Outer Provinces: Amdo - Volume 2. The Gansu and Sichuan Parts of Amdo, White Lotus Press, Bangkok 2001. 
 Tsering Shakya: The Dragon in the Land of Snows. A History of Modern Tibet Since 1947, London 1999,

External links

Official website of Gansu Government

 
Prefecture-level divisions of Gansu
Tibetan autonomous prefectures